Student Exchange is a 1987 American made-for-television comedy film directed by Mollie Miller and produced by Walt Disney Television. It originally aired November 29, 1987 as a presentation of The Disney Sunday Movie on ABC.

Plot
Carole and Neil, two nerdy teenagers, get only perfect grades but have no social skills. When Carole learns that two foreign exchange students from France and Italy have gone to another school, they grab their chance and dress up as the exchange students. For their last semester, they see a fresh start to become popular as the Italian Adriano and French Simone. But for how long can the scheme go on?

Cast
 Viveka Davis as Carole Whitcomb / Simone Swaare
 Todd Field as Neil Barton / Adriano Parbritzzi
 Maura Tierney as Kathy Maltby
 Gavin MacLeod as Vice Principal Durfner
 Mitchell Anderson as Rod
 Heather Graham as Dorrie Ryder
 Kim Walker as Kit
 Lee Garlington as Mrs. Whitcomb
 David Selburg as Mr. Whitcomb
 Nancy Lenehan as Mrs. Barton
 Glenn Shadix as Mr. Barton
 Virginya Keehne as Lucy Whitcomb
 Lisa Hartman as Peggy Whitcomb
 Nancy Fish as Mrs. Vera
 Edward Edwards as Mr. Gordon
 Rob Estes as Beach
 Moon Unit Zappa as Biker Joe
 O. J. Simpson as Soccer Coach
 Lindsay Wagner as Principal

Reception
On Rotten Tomatoes there is no critic consensus but audience reactions were favorable.

Home media
Disney released a DVD-on-Demand version of the film as part of their "Disney Generations Collection" line of DVDs on June 26, 2011.

External links
 
 Student Exchange DVD
 

1987 television films
1987 films
1987 comedy films
ABC network original films
1980s teen comedy films
American teen comedy films
Student exchange in fiction
Disney television films
Films with screenplays by William Davies
1980s English-language films
1980s American films
American comedy television films